The collared finchbill (Spizixos semitorques) is a species of songbird in the bulbul family, Pycnonotidae. It is found in China, Taiwan, Japan and Vietnam.

The species favors forested hills at moderate elevations. Primarily a frugivore, the collared finchbill also eats seeds and insects. The birds are typically monogamous, with females building nests in trees in which to lay their eggs.

Taxonomy and systematics
Alternate names for the collared finchbill include the black-headed finch-bill, Chinese finch-bill, Japanese finch-bill, collared finch-billed bulbul and Swinhoe's finch-billed bulbul.

Subspecies
Two subspecies are recognized:
 S. s. semitorques - R. Swinhoe, 1861: Found in central and southern China, northern Vietnam
 S. s. cinereicapillus - R. Swinhoe, 1871: Originally described as a separate species. Found in Taiwan and Miyako and Yaeyama Islands of Japan

References

collared finchbill
Birds of China
 Birds of Japan
Birds of Taiwan
Birds of Hong Kong
collared finchbill
Taxonomy articles created by Polbot